is a dam in Ōkuwa, Nagano Prefecture, Japan, completed in 1977.

See also

 List of dams and reservoirs in Japan

References 

Dams in Nagano Prefecture
Dams completed in 1977
1977 establishments in Japan
Gravity dams